The 2024 United States House of Representatives elections in Minnesota will be held on November 5, 2024, to elect the 8 U.S. Representatives from the state of Minnesota, one from each of the state's congressional districts. The elections will coincide with the U.S. presidential election, as well as other elections to the House of Representatives, elections to the United States Senate, and various state and local elections.

District 2 

The 2nd district is based in the south Twin Cities area. The incumbent is Democrat Angie Craig, who was re-elected with 50.9% of the vote in 2022.

Democratic primary

Potential 
 Angie Craig, incumbent U.S. Representative

Republican primary

Filed paperwork 
 Mike Murphy, former mayor of Lexington and candidate for Governor of Minnesota in 2022

Publicly expressed interest 
 Tyler Kistner, U.S. Marine Corps Reserve officer and nominee for this district in 2020 and 2022

General election

Predictions

References 

2024
Minnesota
United States House of Representatives